Joseph Sinnott Mansion, also known in Gaelic as "Rathalla," meaning "home of the chieftain on the highest hill" is the Main Building at Rosemont College. It is an historic home located on the campus of Rosemont College at Rosemont, Montgomery County, Pennsylvania.  It was originally a part of the Ashbridge estate and was called 'Rosemont Farm'. However, in 1889, Joseph F. Sinnott, a Whiskey distiller, purchased the 40-acre land. Upon it was built his summer home between the years of 1889-1891 by Hazlehurst & Huckel for $150,000. Edward Hazelhurst and Samuel Huckel were both fellows of the American Institute of Architects 

Rathalla is a -story, 32-roomed stone building on a brick foundation in a Renaissance Revival / Châteauesque style. The mansion features a high, steep sided, slate covered hipped roof, six decorated chimneys, numerous dormer windows, turrets, and stone carvings including gargoyles. The exterior of the home is laden with 52 carved limestone images.  The stained glass window above the staircase features the Sinnott family's coat of arms, containing the motto "Ama Deum et Serva Mandata." This crest consists of a black swan above a striped wreath, with a gold crown around its neck and an arrow piercing its heart. Beneath this swan is a coat of arms with three more black swan. The motto is written on a scroll that drapes beneath the images. Hazelhurst and Huckel built the mansion in the style of the Loire Valley homes in France. This style was quite in vogue at the time, as high end clients such as the Vanderbilts in New York also fashioned their mansions in a chateaux style during the same decade.

The property was purchased for $250,000 by the Sisters, Society of the Holy Child of Jesus (SHCJ) in 1921  and later sold for $1 to Rosemont College in 1927.

As the Main Building of Rosemont College, Rathalla has seen its fair share of elite guests. Among these notable visitors are John F. Kennedy in 1953, whose sister, Patricia, graduated from Rosemont College in the forties, and Joseph Biden as the 1974 commencement speaker. Both Biden and Kennedy were senators when they visited Rosemont and Rathalla. Archbishop Fulton J. Sheen was a frequent visitor of Rathalla and Rosemont College, speaking at over thirty graduation ceremonies.

Rathalla was added to the National Register of Historic Places in 1980. Rathalla is said to have historic significance because it embodies the era in which it was built.

The Main Building at Rosemont College can be seen in the films "The Sterling Chase" and "Tenure," as filming took place on the college's campus.

In 1999 The board of trustees at Rosemont College updated the mechanical systems in Rathalla, their Main Building.  New wiring, heating and air conditioning, modern plumbing, an elevator, chair lift, and a handicapped accessible bedroom were all added.  The construction company, Pancoast and Clifford Inc., was awarded the "Best Restoration/ Renovation Award" which is given annually by the Associated Builders and Contractors, Inc. in recognition of their feat of renovation.

References

Houses on the National Register of Historic Places in Pennsylvania
Renaissance Revival architecture in Pennsylvania
Houses completed in 1891
Houses in Montgomery County, Pennsylvania
National Register of Historic Places in Montgomery County, Pennsylvania